Argylia is a genus of flowering plants that is a member of the family Bignoniaceae.

Species
 Argylia adscendens DC.
 Argylia bifrons Phil.
 Argylia bustillosii Phil.
 Argylia checoensis (Meyen) I.M.Johnst.
 Argylia conaiensis Ravenna
 Argylia farnesiana Gleisner & Ricardi	Accepted
 Argylia geranioides DC.
 Argylia glutinosa Phil.
 Argylia potentillifolia DC.
 Argylia radiata (L.) D.Don
 Argylia robusta Sandwith
 Argylia tomentosa Phil.
 Argylia uspallatensis DC.

References

 
Bignoniaceae genera